Elke Richter (born 4 September 1960) is a German former footballer who played as a defender. She made 27 appearances for the Germany national team from 1983 to 1988.

References

External links
 

1960 births
Living people
German women's footballers
Women's association football defenders
Germany women's international footballers
Place of birth missing (living people)